The 2012–13 Ligue 2 season was the 74th season since its establishment. The league schedule was announced in April 2012 and the fixtures were determined on 30 May. The season began on 27 July and ended on 24 May 2013. The winter break was in effect from 22 December to 12 January 2013. In addition, German sportswear company Uhlsport became the official provider of match balls for the season after agreeing to a long-term partnership with the Ligue de Football Professionnel.

Teams 
There were three promoted teams from the Championnat National, replacing the three teams that were relegated from Ligue 2 following the 2011–12 season. A total of 20 teams are currently competing in the league with three clubs suffering relegation to the third division, Championnat National. All clubs that secured Ligue 2 status for the season were subject to approval by the DNCG before becoming eligible to participate.

Auxerre was the first club to suffer relegation to Ligue 2 in the 2011–12 Ligue 1 season. The club's drop was confirmed on 13 May 2012 following the team's 3–0 loss to Marseille; a defeat that made it impossible for the club to finish safe. Auxerre returned to the second division after 32 consecutive years playing in Ligue 1. Prior to the 2011–12 season, the club had never suffered relegation from the country's top division. On the final day of the 2011–12 Ligue 1 season, Dijon and Caen were both relegated to Ligue 2 following defeats to Rennes and Valenciennes, respectively. Dijon returned to the second division after only one season in Ligue 1, while Caen fell to the second-tier after two years in the first division.

On 18 May 2012, both Nîmes and Gazélec Ajaccio were promoted to Ligue 2 after each club achieved results that made it impossible for the league's fourth-placed team to surpass them. Nîmes returned to the second division after only one year at semi-professional level, while Gazélec will play in Ligue 2 for the first time since the 1992–93 season. On the final day of the 2011–12 National season, Niort became the final club to earn promotion to Ligue 2 after beating already-promoted Gazélec Ajaccio 1–0. Niort returned to the second division for the first time since the 2007–08 season.

DNCG rulings 

On 11 July 2012, following a preliminary review of each club's administrative and financial accounts in Ligue 2, the DNCG ruled that Le Mans would be relegated to the Championnat National. Following the announcement, Le Mans president Henri Legarda announced that the club would appeal the decision stating the "shareholders will play their part and the club will go after every possible step to restore its rightful place in the sport." On 25 July, Le Mans confirmed on its official website that the DNCG had reversed it decision to relegate the club.

Stadia and locations

Personnel and kits 
Note: Flags indicate national team as has been defined under FIFA eligibility rules. Players and managers may hold more than one non-FIFA nationality.

1Subject to change during the season.

Managerial changes

League table

Results

Season statistics

Top goalscorers

Source: Official Goalscorers' Standings

Assists table

Source: Official Assists' Table

Hat-tricks 

 4 Player scored 4 goals

Scoring 

First goal of the season: Steeven Langil for Auxerre against Nîmes (27 July 2012)

List of 2012–13 transfers

References

External links 

 

Ligue 2 seasons
French
2